Knut Aga (born 4 January 1971) is a retired Norwegian football striker and defender.

He played youth football for Rælingen and Strømmen, and was drafted into Strømmen's senior team in 1989. Ahead of the 1992 season he transferred to Bryne, but already in 1993 he went on to Vålerenga. He became the club's top goalscorer in 1994 with 8 goals, but was repositioned as a full back.

In 1997 he joined Lyn, but never became a regular. He rounded off his career in lowly Sørumsand IF and later turned to coaching.

After a successful run as head coach of Skedsmo FK, securing two promotions, Aga went on to coach Lørenskog IF in 2007 whence he resigned in the autumn of 2009. He returned to Skedsmo ahead of the 2010 season, but resigned in the summer of 2010 for personal reasons. Ahead of the 2011 season he signed on to Fet IL, but resigned already in May 2011, again citing personal reasons. Aga rejoined Skedsmo ahead of the 2016 season.

References

1971 births
Living people
People from Rælingen
Norwegian footballers
Strømmen IF players
Bryne FK players
Vålerenga Fotball players
Lyn Fotball players
Norwegian First Division players
Eliteserien players
Association football forwards
Association football defenders
Norwegian football managers